The Philadelphia Youth Orchestra (PYO) is a youth orchestra in Philadelphia, Pennsylvania.  The orchestra's current Music Director is Louis Scaglione.  The Philadelphia Youth Orchestra is regarded as one of the best youth orchestras in the United States.  The Orchestra works with a "companion ensemble", the Philadelphia Young Artists Orchestra (PYAO), the lower version of PYO, which was established in 1996, and Bravo Brass, a brass ensemble, which was founded in 2003. In 2007, another group, Philadelphia Region Youth String Music, (PRYSM),  was added to the program as a string music education ensemble.  In 2016, a new companion ensemble, the (YMDO), or Young Musicians Debut Orchestra, was introduced.

Philadelphia Youth Orchestra and Philadelphia Young Artists Orchestra
PYO was conducted by Joseph Primavera for 51 years, until 2005 when he retired from the position.  The orchestra is now conducted by Maestro Louis Scaglione. Maestro Primavera was the music director laureate until he died in 2006. Members of both orchestras are chosen through highly competitive auditions held in June and September of every year. PYO holds around six concerts a year while PYAO holds around four a year. The orchestras have played music by such composers as Gustav Mahler, Ludwig van Beethoven, Dmitri Shostakovich, Antonín Dvořák, Igor Stravinsky, Leonard Bernstein, Sergei Prokofiev, Peter Ilyich Tchaikovsky, Richard Wagner, Richard Strauss, and more. The Philadelphia Youth Orchestra has been widely acclaimed by newspapers such as The New York Times, The Philadelphia Inquirer and The UK Post. In addition to playing in prestigious local venues such as Verizon Hall at the Kimmel Center, PYO has participated in numerous international tours with sold-out concerts in countries such as Brazil, Poland, Vienna, China, Czech Republic, Italy, Russia, Jordan, Israel, Spain, England, Switzerland, France, Germany, Argentina, Uruguay, The British Isles, and Australia.

The conductor of the Philadelphia Young Artists Orchestra (PYAO) is Maestra Rosalind Erwin. The Philadelphia Young Musicians Orchestra (PYMO) is led by Maestro Kenneth Bean, and the Philadelphia Region Youth String Music (PRYSM) is directed by Conductor Gloria dePasquale, cellist of the Philadelphia Orchestra.

Famous alumni
David Kwon, violinist
Jae Hoon Kim, clarinetist
Francesca dePasquale, violinist
Joseph Hallman, composer
Elizabeth Pitcairn, violinist
Paul Hewitt, viola
Troy Peters, viola, conductor, composer
Peter Wilson, percussion
Mark Bencivengo, percussion
Paul Lafollette, French horn
Cally Banham, oboe, English horn
Kim Kelter, oboe
Mark J. Donellan, oboe, English horn
Michael Norton, tuba
Joseph McNichols, trumpet
Mike Silvester, clarinet
Dotan Yarden, bassoon
Todd Nichols, percussion, conductor
Robert Peterson, Double Bass, Conductor, and Music Educator

References

 Philadelphia Youth Orchestra website 
 History & Timeline, Philadelphia Youth Orchestra
 PYO Celebrates – 75 Years Young, Philadelphia Youth Orchestra

American youth orchestras
Culture of Philadelphia
Musical groups from Philadelphia
1939 establishments in Pennsylvania
Youth organizations based in Pennsylvania
Musical groups established in 1939
Orchestras based in Pennsylvania